Buzakovo is a rural locality (a village) in Vorshinskoye Rural Settlement, Sobinsky District, Vladimir Oblast, Russia. The population was 6 as of 2010.

Geography 
Buzakovo is located on the Kolochka River, 29 km northeast of Sobinka (the district's administrative centre) by road. Yakovlevo is the nearest rural locality.

References 

Rural localities in Sobinsky District